The Alfa Romeo 159 (Type 939) is a compact executive car manufactured and marketed by Alfa Romeo between 2004 and 2011. Introduced at the 2005 Geneva Motor Show, as a replacement for the 156, the 159 used the GM/Fiat Premium platform, shared with the Alfa Romeo Brera and Spider as well as the Kamal and Visconti concept cars.

The 159 placed third in the 2006 European Car of the Year awards. Production of the 159 ended in November 2011, with 247,661 cars manufactured. The 159's late transition to what was fundamentally made as an E segment platform resulted in the 159 having excessive weight, a problem shared by the Brera coupé and Spider.

Styling

The 159 was designed by Giorgetto Giugiaro in collaboration with the Centro Stile Alfa Romeo. The nose features a traditional Alfa Romeo V-shaped grille and bonnet, and cylindrical headlight clusters. Similar to its coupé counterpart, the front of the car was influenced by the 2002 Brera Concept also designed by Giugiaro, as Fiat asked Giugiaro to transfer the design of the later on its future saloon.

A high waistline broadens until it reaches the rear "C" pillar. Several exterior design cues were intended to make the car appear larger, supposedly to appeal to potential buyers in the United States; where the 159 was ultimately never marketed.

Initial Centro Stile proposals of Tipo 939 exterior from 2001 were rejected but the interior design would be developed further. The interior recalls styling elements from earlier cars, including the 156, such as deeply recessed instruments angled toward the driver. Alfa Romeo intended for the 159 to compete more directly with BMW, Mercedes-Benz and Audi by using higher-quality interior materials.

Model year changes

Several levels of trim were available depending on the market. Four trim levels namely Progression, Distinctive, Exclusive, and Turismo Internazionale (TI) were generally available. In the United Kingdom, there were three available levels of trim: Turismo, Lusso, and Turismo Internazionale (TI). Among other options, the 159 was also available with the Blue&Me infotainment system.

A Sportwagon variant was introduced at the Geneva Motor Show in March 2006. An automatic gearbox option for the 2.4 JTDM diesel model was also launched that year and later extended to other versions.

For the 2008 model year, the mechanics and interiors of the 159 were further developed. All model variants were now equipped with Alfa Romeo's electronic "Q2" limited slip differential. As a result of newly introduced aluminium components, a  weight reduction was achieved. The revised 159 range was introduced at the Geneva Motor Show in March 2008.

For the 2009 model year, Alfa Romeo introduced a turbocharged petrol engine variant badge as "TBi", this 1,742 cc unit has direct injection and variable valve timing in both inlet and exhaust cams. Eventually this unit would replace the GM derived 2.2 and 1.9 JTS units. Also in the same year, a new  JTDm diesel engine became available.

The 159 was discontinued in the United Kingdom on 8 July 2011.

Powertrain
The 159 was available in both front and four-wheel drive configurations. The "Q4" four-wheel-drive system utilises a Torsen Type-C twin-differential (front and centre differential in the same unit with an open front differential) and was available on the 3.2-litre petrol and 2.4-litre diesel engines.

Due to its platform, the 159 is  longer,  wider than its predecessor. The considerable growth in dimensions deterred many 156 owners from considering the 159 as a direct replacement model. Thanks to its new platform, a high level of passive safety was achieved, and the torsional rigidity of the chassis reached 180.000 daNm/rad.

The gearbox is a six-speed manual on most models (with the 1.8-litre model having a five-speed manual), and a six-speed automatic Q-Tronic gearbox (Aisin AW TF-80SC) was available for the 1.9 diesel, 2.4 diesel, and 3.2 petrol models. The Selespeed automated manual gearbox was available in some markets with the 2.2 petrol engine.

All petrol engines featured direct fuel injection (except the 1.8l), named as JTS (Jet Thrust Stoichiometric). JTD diesel engines have common rail direct fuel injection.

Specifications

Performance

Sources:

Safety
The 159 is fitted with seven airbags as standard, with additional knee airbags also available as an option. The car performed well in rear end crash protection tests, benefiting from "anti whiplash" seats.

The 159 passed the Euro NCAP car safety tests with following ratings:

Awards
Auto Bild Design Award 2006
Design Award in the 2006 Fleet World Honours
Die Besten Autos 2007 Import category (Auto, Motor und Sport)
'L'Automobile piu Bella del Mondo

In popular culture 
Two black 159s (3.2 JTS V6 TI) appeared in the opening scenes of the James Bond movie Quantum of Solace (2008). They featured in the car chase with James Bond's Aston Martin DBS V12 around Lake Garda in Italy. Two 159s in black colour also appeared in the chase scene in Johnny English Reborn, chasing Johnny English, played by Rowan Atkinson.

A car strongly resembling a 159 can be seen in multiple episodes of Psycho Pass.

Motorsport
The 159 contested the Bathurst 12 Hour race for production cars in 2007, 2009 and 2010. Competing with the 2.4 Litre JTDM diesel engine, it won the Alternative Energy Class in each of these three races.

References

External links

Alfa Romeo 159 UK Site
Alfa Romeo 159 Sportwagon Official Website
 

159
2010s cars
Cars introduced in 2005
Cars discontinued in 2011
All-wheel-drive vehicles
Front-wheel-drive vehicles
Euro NCAP large family cars
Compact executive cars
Police vehicles
Sports sedans
Station wagons
Italdesign vehicles